L.A. Friday (Live 1975) is a live album by the Rolling Stones, released in 2012. It was recorded at The Forum in Inglewood, California, near Los Angeles. The album was released exclusively as a digital download through Google Music on 2 April 2012. The concert was on Sunday 13 July 1975, but bootleggers used the Rolling Stone title of the review of the Friday show for its vinyl bootleg releases.

A DVD for the Friday 11 July 1975 concert at the Forum was released on 19 November 2014 entitled, From the Vault: L.A Forum (Live in 1975). The official release erroneously states that the DVD recording is from the Saturday 12 July 1975 show.

The set list was the same for both shows, except for the placement of the band introductions.

Track listing
Recorded Sunday, 13 July 1975

DVD track listing
Recorded Friday, 11 July 1975.

Personnel
The Rolling Stones
Mick Jagger – vocals, harmonica; guitar on "Fingerprint File"
Keith Richards – guitars, backing vocals; lead vocals on "Happy"
Bill Wyman – bass guitar; synthesizer on "Fingerprint File"
Charlie Watts – drums; percussion on Billy Preston's songs
Ronnie Wood – guitars, backing vocals; bass guitar on "Fingerprint File"

Additional musicians
Ollie E. Brown – percussion, backing vocals; drums on Billy Preston's songs
Billy Preston – piano, organ, clavinet, synthesizer, backing vocals; lead vocals on his own songs
Ian Stewart – piano on selected songs
Bobby Keys – saxophone
Steve Madaio – trumpet
Trevor Lawrence – saxophone
Jesse Ed Davis – guitar on "Sympathy for the Devil" (13 July show only)
The Steel Association – percussion on "Sympathy for the Devil"

References

2012 live albums
2014 video albums
Albums recorded at the Forum
Eagle Rock Entertainment live albums
Eagle Rock Entertainment video albums
Live video albums
The Rolling Stones films
The Rolling Stones live albums
The Rolling Stones video albums